Calvin Grant Shofner (April 7, 1932 – October 10, 2013), known professionally as Cal Smith, was an American country musician, most famous for his 1974 hits "Country Bumpkin" and "It's Time to Pay the Fiddler".

Career
Calvin Grant Shofner was born on April 7, 1932, in Gans, Oklahoma, as the youngest of three sons of James "Otto" and Ethel (Quinn) Shofner. During the Great Depression, the Smiths headed west and settled in Oakland, California, and he grew up in San Jose, California. Smith began his music career performing at the Remember Me Cafe in San Francisco at the age of 15, but he was not financially successful at first. Throughout the 1950s, he was not able to continue his music career, so he worked at various other jobs, including truck driving and bronco busting. He appeared on the California Hayride television show in the mid-1950s before serving two years in the military.

After his discharge, he began playing in a band in the San Francisco Bay Area. In 1961, country music legend Ernest Tubb heard the band play and, after an audition, hired Smith to play guitar for the Texas Troubadours. Thus, Smith is heard playing in most of Tubb's 1960s recordings. His first solo single was "Tear Stained Pillow" / "Eleven Long Years" on the local Plaid label. Smith's stage name began to catch on after he released his second solo single, "I'll Just Go Home", in 1966 for Kapp Records, and he first cracked the Billboard chart with his second single, "The Only Thing I Want".

Smith permanently parted ways with Tubb and the Texas Troubadours in 1969 and he released his first solo album, Drinking Champagne, in 1969. The album's title track had reached the Top 40 on the country chart the previous year, and was later a Top 10 hit for George Strait in 1990.

In 1970, Smith signed with Decca Records, and his popularity quickly soared, starting off with his 1972 Top 10 hit, "I've Found Someone of My Own". He began recording songs written by some of the biggest names in the industry; for instance, in March 1973, his rendition of Bill Anderson's "The Lord Knows I'm Drinking" became his first number-one country hit. When Decca became MCA Records in 1973, he enjoyed his biggest successes. In 1974, he recorded two of his greatest hits, "It's Time to Pay the Fiddler" and "Country Bumpkin", which received Song of the Year Awards from both the Academy of Country Music and the Country Music Association.

Later career
Smith continued to have success with MCA Records into the late 1970s including the Top 20 singles "Between Lust And Watching TV" (1974), "She Talked A Lot About Texas" (1975), "I Just Came Home To Count The Memories" (1977), and "Come See About Me" (1977). After this he continued to have minor successes that included "The Rise And Fall Of The Roman Empire" in 1979.

Smith released his last album, Stories of Life by Cal Smith, in 1986 on Step One Records, where he scored a minor hit that year with "King Lear".

Personal life
In 1977, Smith joined entrepreneur Larry Schmittou and other country music stars, such as Conway Twitty, Jerry Reed, Larry Gatlin, and Richard Sterban, as investors in the Nashville Sounds, a minor league baseball team of the Double-A Southern League that began play in 1978.

Smith and his wife, Darlene, lived in the Branson, Missouri area.

Smith died in Branson on October 10, 2013. He is survived by Darlene, his son Calvin, five grandchildren and 15 great-grandchildren. He was preceded in death by a son, Jimmie Todd.

Discography

Albums

Singles

A"The Lord Knows I'm Drinking" also peaked at No. 64 on the Billboard Hot 100.

Awards
 1974 — Academy of Country Music - Song of the Year
 1974 — Country Music Association - Song of the Year
 1974 — Country Music Association - Single of the Year
 2007 - Oklahoma Music Hall of Fame - Inductee

References

External links

 Cal Smith at CMT.com

1932 births
2013 deaths
People from Sequoyah County, Oklahoma
Musicians from Oakland, California
American country singer-songwriters
American country guitarists
American male guitarists
MCA Records artists
Decca Records artists
Kapp Records artists
Guitarists from California
20th-century American guitarists
Country musicians from California
Country musicians from Oklahoma
20th-century American male musicians
American male singer-songwriters
Singer-songwriters from Oklahoma
Singer-songwriters from California